Stockmann is a German surname. Notable people with the surname include:

Dieter Stöckmann (born 1941), German general
Hans-Jürgen Stöckmann (born 1945), German physicist
Harry Stockman (1919–1994), American racecar driver
Hayley Stockman (born 1985), New Zealand netball player
Jaap Stockmann (born 1984), Dutch field hockey player
Nis-Momme Stockmann (born 1981), German writer
Paul Stockmann (1603–1636), German composer
Ulrich Stockmann (born 1951), German politician

Fictional characters
Ernst Stockmann, fictional character in the novel The Temple by Stephen Spender
Thomas Stockmann, fictional character in the play An Enemy of the People by Henrik Ibsen
Baxter Stockmann, fictional character in "The Teenage Mutant Ninja Turtles" cartoon series

See also
Elana Maryles Sztokman (born 1969), American writer
Vladimir Shtokman (1909–1968), Russian engineer
Stockman (disambiguation)
Stock (surname)

German-language surnames